Paul Jacobs (born Mortsel, near Antwerp, 24 January 1949) is a Flemish radio and television producer and writer.

Jacobs started his career when he was 22, as a writer and reporter with the BRT 1 radio programme Dagboek, produced by Jan Geysen. The programme was highly controversial and ran for only a year, but Geysen's name opened many doors. For the next ten years Jacobs was able to freelance as a writing journalist and reporter for several radio programmes with BRT 2 Omroep Antwerpen.

In 1981 he became a producer with Radio 1. Until his retirement in 2005 he created several acclaimed radio shows, e.g. Het Vermoeden, De Taalstrijd and Vriend & Vijand, in which he interviewed 200 celebrities in Belgium and the Netherlands.

For VRT television he developed the quizzes Jij of Wij, I.Q. (with Herman Van Molle), Kennis van Zaken en De Tekstbaronnen.  His De Rechtvaardige Rechters was a witty panel game show that ran for almost ten years.

Jacobs published more than 30 books, including five novels (De rode badkuip, Een ijskoud gerecht, De laatste grap, Het droomdagboek van Lavoisier, Het raadsel van Rose Cottage), three short story collections, a selection of his best columns, and two interview books. He wrote three scenarios for the television drama series Made in Vlaanderen: De man die niet van gedichten hield (1981), Het landhuis (1989) and the thriller Moordterras (1991, director Roland Verhavert). For the BRT/Ikon television series Oog in Oog he wrote the monologue De oude bibliotheek (1992).

In 1997 Theater Arca in Gent commissioned Jacobs to write the comedy Komt u hier dikwijls? The play was awarded the Drama Prize of the province of Antwerp, as were three of his radio programmes with the Gouden Klokke Roeland by the Flemish radio and television journalists, as the best programmes of the year.

Paul Jacobs lives in Mortsel and in the South of France.

Flemish writers
1949 births
Living people
People from Mortsel